King Kong Vol. 1 is an EP by American rock music artist Bob Schneider, released on February 10, 2015.

Track listing
"Dirty Feeling"  – 4:02
”King Kong”  – 3:46 
"Magic Wand"  – 3:12
"Montgomery"  – 5:03
"The Fools"  – 4:21

References

Bob Schneider albums
2015 EPs